Salvador Plascencia is an American writer, born 21 December 1976 in Guadalajara, Mexico.

The Plascencia family eventually settled near Los Angeles in the city of El Monte when he was eight years old. Plascencia holds a B.A. in English from Whittier College and an MFA in fiction from Syracuse University. The recipient of a National Foundation for Advancement in the Arts Award in Fiction in 1996 and the Peter Neagoe Prize for Fiction in 2000. In 2001 he was awarded a Paul & Daisy Soros Fellowship for New Americans, its first fellow in fiction. He was awarded the Bard Fiction Prize from Bard College in 2008.

His first published fiction appeared in McSweeney's Issue 12.  McSweeney's also published his first novel, The People of Paper, in 2005.

In its January 2010 issue, Poets & Writers named Plascencia one of the "Fifty Most Inspiring Living Authors in the World."

In August 2015, Plascencia began teaching creative writing at Harvey Mudd College.

External links
Author's site
Nashville Review interview
McSweeney's page
Bookslut interview
3:AM review 
Hobart interview
Online interview with author  on Letras Latinas Oral History Project.

References

1976 births
Living people
Syracuse University alumni
Whittier College alumni
21st-century American novelists
American male novelists
McSweeney's
People from El Monte, California
American male short story writers
Hispanic and Latino American novelists
American writers of Mexican descent
21st-century American short story writers
21st-century American male writers
Novelists from California
Harvey Mudd College faculty